The Izhevsk constituency (No.34) is a Russian legislative constituency in the Udmurtia. Until 2007 it was a primarily urban constituency, covering Izhevsk and Votkinsk, however, since 2016 the constituency covers southern Udmurtia and parts of Izhevsk.

Members elected

Election results

1993

|-
! colspan=2 style="background-color:#E9E9E9;text-align:left;vertical-align:top;" |Candidate
! style="background-color:#E9E9E9;text-align:left;vertical-align:top;" |Party
! style="background-color:#E9E9E9;text-align:right;" |Votes
! style="background-color:#E9E9E9;text-align:right;" |%
|-
|style="background-color:#019CDC"|
|align=left|Aleksey Krasnykh
|align=left|Party of Russian Unity and Accord
|
|19.80%
|-
| colspan="5" style="background-color:#E9E9E9;"|
|- style="font-weight:bold"
| colspan="3" style="text-align:left;" | Total
| 
| 100%
|-
| colspan="5" style="background-color:#E9E9E9;"|
|- style="font-weight:bold"
| colspan="4" |Source:
|
|}

1995

|-
! colspan=2 style="background-color:#E9E9E9;text-align:left;vertical-align:top;" |Candidate
! style="background-color:#E9E9E9;text-align:left;vertical-align:top;" |Party
! style="background-color:#E9E9E9;text-align:right;" |Votes
! style="background-color:#E9E9E9;text-align:right;" |%
|-
|style="background-color:"|
|align=left|Andrey Soluyanov
|align=left|Independent
|
|15.60%
|-
|style="background-color:"|
|align=left|Vladimir Podoprigora
|align=left|Independent
|
|14.51%
|-
|style="background-color:"|
|align=left|Galina Repina
|align=left|Communist Party
|
|12.43%
|-
|style="background-color:"|
|align=left|Natalya Kuznetsova
|align=left|Independent
|
|11.36%
|-
|style="background-color:#E98282"|
|align=left|Galina Klimantova
|align=left|Women of Russia
|
|10.13%
|-
|style="background-color:#2C299A"|
|align=left|Sergey Molchanov
|align=left|Congress of Russian Communities
|
|7.04%
|-
|style="background-color:#3A46CE"|
|align=left|Vitaly Skrynnik
|align=left|Democratic Choice of Russia – United Democrats
|
|6.82%
|-
|style="background-color:"|
|align=left|Mikhail Kokorin
|align=left|Independent
|
|4.47%
|-
|style="background-color:"|
|align=left|Ildar Mavlutdinov
|align=left|Independent
|
|3.03%
|-
|style="background-color:#DA2021"|
|align=left|Aleksey Krasnykh (incumbent)
|align=left|Ivan Rybkin Bloc
|
|2.50%
|-
|style="background-color:#F7C451"|
|align=left|Olga Gurina
|align=left|Common Cause
|
|2.30%
|-
|style="background-color:"|
|align=left|Dmitry Glavatskikh
|align=left|Power to the People
|
|0.68%
|-
|style="background-color:#000000"|
|colspan=2 |against all
|
|6.87%
|-
| colspan="5" style="background-color:#E9E9E9;"|
|- style="font-weight:bold"
| colspan="3" style="text-align:left;" | Total
| 
| 100%
|-
| colspan="5" style="background-color:#E9E9E9;"|
|- style="font-weight:bold"
| colspan="4" |Source:
|
|}

1999

|-
! colspan=2 style="background-color:#E9E9E9;text-align:left;vertical-align:top;" |Candidate
! style="background-color:#E9E9E9;text-align:left;vertical-align:top;" |Party
! style="background-color:#E9E9E9;text-align:right;" |Votes
! style="background-color:#E9E9E9;text-align:right;" |%
|-
|style="background-color:"|
|align=left|Yury Maslyukov
|align=left|Independent
|
|22.36%
|-
|style="background-color:"|
|align=left|Andrey Soluyanov (incumbent)
|align=left|Independent
|
|20.32%
|-
|style="background-color:"|
|align=left|Vladimir Zabilsky
|align=left|Unity
|
|14.61%
|-
|style="background-color:"|
|align=left|Vitaly Solovyev
|align=left|Independent
|
|6.13%
|-
|style="background-color:#D50000"|
|align=left|Nikolay Baranov
|align=left|Communists and Workers of Russia - for the Soviet Union
|
|6.12%
|-
|style="background-color:#E98282"|
|align=left|Olga Gurina
|align=left|Women of Russia
|
|6.07%
|-
|style="background-color:"|
|align=left|Lyudmila Yairova
|align=left|Our Home – Russia
|
|3.99%
|-
|style="background-color:#084284"|
|align=left|Irina Sinitsyna
|align=left|Spiritual Heritage
|
|1.67%
|-
|style="background-color:"|
|align=left|Vladimir Alekseyev
|align=left|Kedr
|
|1.56%
|-
|style="background-color:#FF4400"|
|align=left|Nikolay Makarov
|align=left|Andrey Nikolayev and Svyatoslav Fyodorov Bloc
|
|1.02%
|-
|style="background-color:"|
|align=left|Sergey Baranov
|align=left|Independent
|
|0.94%
|-
|style="background-color:"|
|align=left|Vladimir Syamin
|align=left|Independent
|
|0.94%
|-
|style="background-color:"|
|align=left|Anatoly Baranov
|align=left|Independent
|
|0.27%
|-
|style="background-color:#000000"|
|colspan=2 |against all
|
|11.90%
|-
| colspan="5" style="background-color:#E9E9E9;"|
|- style="font-weight:bold"
| colspan="3" style="text-align:left;" | Total
| 
| 100%
|-
| colspan="5" style="background-color:#E9E9E9;"|
|- style="font-weight:bold"
| colspan="4" |Source:
|
|}

2003

|-
! colspan=2 style="background-color:#E9E9E9;text-align:left;vertical-align:top;" |Candidate
! style="background-color:#E9E9E9;text-align:left;vertical-align:top;" |Party
! style="background-color:#E9E9E9;text-align:right;" |Votes
! style="background-color:#E9E9E9;text-align:right;" |%
|-
|style="background-color:"|
|align=left|Yevgeny Bogomolov
|align=left|United Russia
|
|32.12%
|-
|style="background-color:"|
|align=left|Andrey Andreyev
|align=left|Communist Party
|
|15.35%
|-
|style="background-color:#1042A5"|
|align=left|Dmitry Shumkov
|align=left|Union of Right Forces
|
|13.85%
|-
|style="background-color:"|
|align=left|Sergey Shuklin
|align=left|Social Democratic Party
|
|5.83%
|-
|style="background-color:"|
|align=left|Vladimir Zabilsky
|align=left|Independent
|
|4.78%
|-
|style="background-color:"|
|align=left|Viktor Yevdokimov
|align=left|Liberal Democratic Party
|
|4.60%
|-
|style="background-color:#00A1FF"|
|align=left|Anatoly Arefyev
|align=left|Party of Russia's Rebirth-Russian Party of Life
|
|1.82%
|-
|style="background-color:"|
|align=left|Yevgeny Kulagin
|align=left|Independent
|
|0.81%
|-
|style="background-color:#000000"|
|colspan=2 |against all
|
|18.84%
|-
| colspan="5" style="background-color:#E9E9E9;"|
|- style="font-weight:bold"
| colspan="3" style="text-align:left;" | Total
| 
| 100%
|-
| colspan="5" style="background-color:#E9E9E9;"|
|- style="font-weight:bold"
| colspan="4" |Source:
|
|}

2016

|-
! colspan=2 style="background-color:#E9E9E9;text-align:left;vertical-align:top;" |Candidate
! style="background-color:#E9E9E9;text-align:leftt;vertical-align:top;" |Party
! style="background-color:#E9E9E9;text-align:right;" |Votes
! style="background-color:#E9E9E9;text-align:right;" |%
|-
|style="background-color:"|
|align=left|Valery Buzilov
|align=left|United Russia
|
|50.85%
|-
|style="background-color:"|
|align=left|Vladimir Bodrov
|align=left|Communist Party
|
|15.59%
|-
|style="background:"| 
|align=left|Farid Yunusov
|align=left|A Just Russia
|
|13.31%
|-
|style="background-color:"|
|align=left|Anton Gusev
|align=left|Liberal Democratic Party
|
|10.19%
|-
|style="background:"| 
|align=left|Yury Mishkin
|align=left|Communists of Russia
|
|3.05%
|-
|style="background:"| 
|align=left|Mikhail Nazarov
|align=left|Yabloko
|
|1.92%
|-
|style="background:"| 
|align=left|Ruslan Timurshin
|align=left|People's Freedom Party
|
|1.59%
|-
| colspan="5" style="background-color:#E9E9E9;"|
|- style="font-weight:bold"
| colspan="3" style="text-align:left;" | Total
| 
| 100%
|-
| colspan="5" style="background-color:#E9E9E9;"|
|- style="font-weight:bold"
| colspan="4" |Source:
|
|}

2021

|-
! colspan=2 style="background-color:#E9E9E9;text-align:left;vertical-align:top;" |Candidate
! style="background-color:#E9E9E9;text-align:left;vertical-align:top;" |Party
! style="background-color:#E9E9E9;text-align:right;" |Votes
! style="background-color:#E9E9E9;text-align:right;" |%
|-
|style="background-color:"|
|align=left|Oleg Garin
|align=left|United Russia
|
|33.36%
|-
|style="background-color:"|
|align=left|Vladimir Bodrov
|align=left|Communist Party
|
|21.80%
|-
|style="background-color: " |
|align=left|Askold Zapashny
|align=left|A Just Russia — For Truth
|
|10.23%
|-
|style="background-color:"|
|align=left|Timur Yagafarov
|align=left|Liberal Democratic Party
|
|5.91%
|-
|style="background-color:"|
|align=left|Aleksandr Tugulev
|align=left|Party of Pensioners
|
|5.06%
|-
|style="background-color:"|
|align=left|Sergey Chudayev
|align=left|New People
|
|4.52%
|-
|style="background-color:"|
|align=left|Yury Mishkin
|align=left|Communists of Russia
|
|4.02%
|-
|style="background-color:"|
|align=left|Roza Akhmedshina
|align=left|Green Alternative
|
|3.79%
|-
|style="background-color:"|
|align=left|Pavel Belinov
|align=left|Rodina
|
|3.04%
|-
|style="background-color:"|
|align=left|Iya Boronina
|align=left|Yabloko
|
|2.50%
|-
|style="background:"| 
|align=left|Sergey Zaychikov
|align=left|Civic Platform
|
|1.21%
|-
| colspan="5" style="background-color:#E9E9E9;"|
|- style="font-weight:bold"
| colspan="3" style="text-align:left;" | Total
| 
| 100%
|-
| colspan="5" style="background-color:#E9E9E9;"|
|- style="font-weight:bold"
| colspan="4" |Source:
|
|}

Notes

References

Russian legislative constituencies
Politics of Udmurtia